The 2016 season was the third season in Kerala Blasters FC's existence, as well as their third season in Indian Super League. After finishing second position in the league stage, the club managed to make it to the final. In the finals, they were again defeated by Atlético de Kolkata, this time through the penalty shoot-out.

Background
In 2016, in an effort to rebuild after failing to qualify for the finals the previous season, Kerala Blasters announced the signing of former Crystal Palace manager Steve Coppell as head coach on 21 June 2016. A week later, the club announced the signing of Northern Ireland international Aaron Hughes as their marquee player for the season. Other moves made before the season included the signing of Graham Stack, Kervens Belfort, Duckens Nazon, and Mohammed Rafique and return of former players Michael Chopra and Cédric Hengbart.

The season began where the previous left off, with a 1–0 defeat away from home against NorthEast United. After the first month of the season, the Blasters had one of the best defenses statistically in the league but struggled in attack. In the second half of the season, after the return of C.K. Vineeth from loan with Bengaluru FC, the Blasters managed to surge their way into the finals. They achieved this by defeating Delhi Dynamos 3–0 in a penalty shootout during the semi-final. In the final, the Kerala Blasters would play host to Atlético de Kolkata. The Blasters took the lead early through Mohammed Rafi before Kolkata equalized soon after. The match went into a penalty shootout, Despite taking the lead early in the shootout, the Kerala Blasters lost 4–3 and thus were defeated in their second final in three seasons.

Players

Squad

Source: Indian Super League 2016

Transfers

Retained

Foreign players

Indian players

New signings

Pre-season

Indian Super League

Results summary

Results

Player statistics

See also
 2016–17 in Indian football

References

Kerala Blasters FC seasons
Kerala Blasters FC